Axel Fredrik Claësson Wachtmeister af Johannishus (born February 10, 1855) was Swedish politician and diplomat who from 2 August 1905 until 7 November 1905 served as Minister of Foreign Affairs of Sweden.

Early life 
Fredrik Wachtmeister was born on 2 August 1905 in the family of Lieutenant Claes Wachtmeister. He grew up in Thystad Castle in Nyköping Municipality, Södermanland County.

Career 
For several years he held diplomatic posts at the Swedish embassies in Paris, Rome and Vienna, but left diplomacy at the age of 27.

From 1895 to 1916 he was a member of the Riksdag as a member of Protectionist Party, and in 1913 - 1914 he was chairman of the committee on government.

From 2 August 1905 until 7 November 1905 served as Minister of Foreign Affairs of Sweden.

In 1906 he was the head of the Nationalmuseum.

From 1907 to 1916 he served as Chancellor of Uppsala University.

In 1906, he refused the offer of the king to take up the post of prime minister.

From 1907 to 1918 he was chairman of the board of the Nobel Foundation and inspector at the Nobel Institute, and since 1907 - chairman of the National Forestry Institute.

Member of Royal Swedish Academy of Sciences (since 1912), Royal Physiographic Society in Lund (since 1908), Royal Swedish Academy of Fine Arts (since 1902), Royal Swedish Academy of Letters, History and Antiquities (since 1912), Royal Swedish Academy of Agriculture and Forestry (since 1905), Royal Society of Sciences in Uppsala (since 1910).

Fredrik Wachtmeister died on 6 September 1919.

References

Sources 

 Fredrik Cl: son Wachtmeister. Min fars liv och verk. I—II , Maud von Steyern, Natur och Kultur, 1962.
 Sveriges statskalender för år 1913, utgifven efter Kungl. Maj: ts nådigste förordnande av dess Vetenskapsakademi, Uppsala & Stockholm 1913 ISSN 0347-7223, avsnitt 129, 715, 797, 834, 838, 842, 853, 854, 860, 901.
 Tvåkammarriksdagen 1867—1970 (Almqvist & Wiksell International 1988), band 1, s. 400

Swedish Ministers for Foreign Affairs
Swedish counts
Swedish diplomats
Members of the Royal Swedish Academy of Sciences
Members of the Royal Swedish Academy of Arts
Members of the Royal Swedish Academy of Letters, History and Antiquities
Members of the Royal Physiographic Society in Lund
1855 births
1919 deaths
Members of the Royal Society of Sciences in Uppsala